Tanougha is a town and rural commune in Béni Mellal Province, Béni Mellal-Khénifra, Morocco. At the time of the 2004 census, the commune had a total population of 10,874 people living in 2093 households.

References

Populated places in Béni Mellal Province
Rural communes of Béni Mellal-Khénifra